The Invincibles was a nickname given to the 1924–25 New Zealand national team which toured the United Kingdom, Ireland, France and Canada. The team was captained by Cliff Porter, and numbered among its top players George Nēpia and brothers Cyril and Maurice Brownlie. During the test against England Cyril Brownlie was sent off by the Welsh referee Albert Freethy, the first player to be sent off from a test.

Between September 1924 and February 1925, the team played 32 games including four test matches, one each against Ireland, England, Wales, and France. They won all 32 games, scoring 838 points and only having 116 points scored against them.

Cliff Porter was tour captain, but played only 17 of the 32 games due to injury, including just one test (against France). During the remaining games, tour vice-captain Johnstone Richardson (Jock) took over the captaincy.

Touring party

Management
Manager: Stanley Dean (Wellington)
Captain: Cliff Porter

Full-backs
 George Nēpia (Hawke's Bay)

Three-quarters
 Handley Brown (Taranaki)
 Gus Hart (Taranaki)
 Fred Lucas (Auckland)
 Alan Robilliard (Canterbury)
 Snowy Svenson (Wellington)
 Jack Steel (West Coast)

Five-eighths
 Ces Badeley (Auckland)
 Bert Cooke (Auckland)
 Neil McGregor (Canterbury)
 Mark Nicholls (Wellington)
 Lui Paewai (Hawke's Bay)

Half-backs
 Bill Dalley (Canterbury)
 Jimmy Mill (Hawke's Bay)

Wing forwards
 Jim Parker (Canterbury)
 Cliff Porter (Wellington)

Forwards
 Cyril Brownlie (Hawke's Bay)
 Maurice Brownlie (Hawke's Bay)
 Les Cupples (Bay of Plenty)
 Quentin Donald (Wairarapa)
 Ian Harvey (Wairarapa)
 Bull Irvine (Hawke's Bay)
 Read Masters (Canterbury)
 Brian McCleary (Canterbury)
 Abe Munro (Otago)
 Jock Richardson (Southland)
 Ron Stewart (South Canterbury)
 Alf West (Taranaki)
 Andrew White (Southland)

Match summary
Complete list of matches played by the All Blacks in the British Isles, France and Canada:
 Test matches

The test-matches

Ireland

Ireland: 15.William Crawford, 14.Henry Stephenson, 13.George Stephenson, 12.James Gardiner, 11.Tom Hewitt, 10.Frank Hewitt, 9.John McDowell, 8.James Clinch, 7.Robert Crichton, 6.Norman Brand, 5.William Collis, 4.Alex Spain, 3.Dick Collopy, 2.Thomas McClelland, 1.Jim McVicker
New Zealand: 15.George Nēpia, 14.Snowy Svenson, 13.Frederick Lucas, 12.Bert Cooke, 11.Augustine Hart, 10.Mark Nicholls, 9.Bill Dalley, 8.Les Cupples, 7.Son White, 6.Jock Richardson (c), 5.Read Masters, 4.Maurice Brownlie, 3.Bull Irvine, 2.Quentin Donald, 1.James Parker

Wales

Wales: Tom Johnson (Cardiff), Ernie Finch (Llanelli), Albert Jenkins (Llanelli), Albert Stock (Newport), Rowe Harding (Swansea), Jack Wetter (Newport) capt., Eddie Williams (Neath), Bobby Delahay (Cardiff), Dai Parker (Swansea), Jack Gore, (Blaina), Charlie Pugh (Maesteg), Steve Morris (Cross Keys), Cliff Williams (Llanelli), Douglas Marsden-Jones (London Welsh), Dai Hiddlestone (Neath) 
New Zealand: G Nēpia, J Steel, AE Cooke, KS Svenson, NP McGregor, MF Nicholls, J Mill, JH Parker, WR Irvine, Q Donald, RR Masters, LF Cupples, CJ Brownlie, MJ Brownlie, J Richardson (capt.)

England 

England:15.Jim Brough, 14.Richard Hamilton-Wickes, 13.Vivian Davies, 12.Leonard Corbett, 11.John Gibbs, 10.Harold Kittermaster, 9.Arthur Young, 8.Tom Voyce, 7.Geoffrey Conway, 6.Freddie Blakiston, 5.Ron Cove-Smith, 4.Wavell Wakefield (cap.), 3.Ronald Hillard, 2.Sam Tucker, 1.Reg Edwards
New Zealand:15.George Nēpia, 14.John Steel, 13.Bert Cooke, 12.Mark Nicholls, 11.Snowy Svenson, 10.Neil McGregor, 9.Jimmy Mill, 8.Jock Richardson (cap.), 7.Son White, 6.Cyril Brownlie , 5.Read Masters, 4.Maurice Brownlie, 3.Bull Irvine, 2.Quentin Donald, 1.James Parker,

France

Bibliography
 Chester, R., Palenski, R., and McMillan, N. (1998)  The Encyclopedia of New Zealand Rugby. Auckland: Hodder Moa Beckett.

References

Invincibles
Invincibles
New Zealand national rugby union team tours of Europe
Rugby union tours of England
Rugby union tours of Ireland
Rugby union tours of Wales
Rugby union tours of France
Tour
Tour
1924–25 in French rugby union
1924–25 in British rugby union
Rugby union tours of Canada
1925 in Canadian rugby union